Ulrich Almer was a Swiss mountain guide, born on 8 May 1849 in Grindelwald where he died on 4 September 1940. He made many premieres in the Alps, at the beginning with his father Christian Almer, one of the great guides of the golden age of mountaineering, and was one of the first Swiss guides to visit the Caucasus.

Biography 
Ulrich Almer performs about fifteen premieres including those of the Aiguille de Blaitière and Aiguille de Triolet. In 1874, on the descent after an attempt at the south face of Mont Blanc, his roped party fell into a crevasse on the Brouillard glacier, JAG Marshal and Johann Fischer dying instantly; Ulrich Almer, unconscious but unharmed, manages to get out of the crevasse and join Courmayeur. To make matters worse, thirty-eight years later, in 1912, during a descent of the Aletschhorn, it was the turn of Andreas Fisher, Johann Fischer's son, and with the same guide, to be the victim of a fall in a crevasse. Ulrich Almer's reputation was definitely tarnished.

Ascents 
 1870 - Premiere of Ailefroide with William Auguste Coolidge with Christian Almer and Ch. Gertsch, on July 7 
 1873 - Premiere of the northern tip of the Aiguille de Blaitière with Thomas Stuart Kennedy, J. A. G. Marshall and Johann Fisher
 1874 - Premiere of the aiguille de Triolet with J. A. G. Marshall and Johann Fisher, on August 26
 1874 - Attempt on the south face of Mont Blanc with J. G. A. Marshal and Johann Fisher, on August 31. They had probably made in passing the first point of the point which will be called later pic Eccles
 1875 - Premiere of the roche de la Muzelle with W. A. Coolidge and Christian Almer, on July 2 
 1876 - Premiere of the western summit of Droites, with W.A. Coolidge and Christian Almer, on July 18
 1876 - First of the south-eastern ridge of Täschhorn with James Jackson
 1877 -  with William Auguste Coolidge and Christian Almer, on July 14
 1891 - First crossing of Meije in a west–east direction from the Grand Pic to the Doigt de Dieu with J.-H. Gibson and Fritz Boss
 1883 - First ascent of the northwest ridge of the Schreckhorn via Andersongrat route with Aloys Pollinger, John Stafford Anderson and G. P. Baker
 1884 - First crossing of the Breithorn with John Stafford Anderson and Aloys Pollinger, on August 16, making in passing the first of the secondary summits of the Eastern Breithorn, the Breithornzwillinge and the Roccia Nera, considered today in the list of 82 Alpine summits over 4000 meters) 
 1888 - First ascent of the northern summit of Ushba (Caucasus) with John Garford Cockin
 1888 - First ascent of Shkhara with J. Cockin and C. Roth

References 

1849 births
1940 deaths
People from Interlaken-Oberhasli District
Alpine guides
Swiss mountain climbers
People from Grindelwald